Bradstone is a village in Devon, England, on the River Tamar. It has a small church and a Tudor hall (now a farm) with an attractive gatehouse.

Bradstone Manor Farm is a Grade II listed manor house with a Grade I listed 16th century gatehouse. 
 
The Church of St Nonna was built in the 12th century. It has been designated as a Grade I listed building and is now in the care of the Churches Conservation Trust. The church has an arcaded north aisle. The west tower was added in the 15th century. The tracery in the south wall of the chancel is believed to date from 1261 when the church was dedicated by Bishop Walter Branscombe. Outside the tower is a stone dedicated to John Coumbe, said to have lived from 1484 to 1604 — outliving the entire Tudor dynasty.

References

Bradstone at GENUKI
Bradstone community page

External links

Villages in the Borough of West Devon